Svetlana Dzantemirovna Adyrkhaeva (born May 12, 1938) is an Ossetian and Soviet ballerina. People's Artist of the USSR (1984).

Biography
Adyrkhaeva was born on May 12, 1938 in a village of Khumalag in North Ossetia. She received ballet training at the Vaganova Choreography School and graduated from there in 1955. Three years later she danced Odette-Odile and won first prize for it. In 1960 she was invited to do the same dance at the Bolshoi Theatre. There, she was disciplined by Galina Ulanova but received further mentorship from Marina Semyonova. She participated in a ballet for two generations playing characters such as Aegina in Spartacus, and many others. From 1978 to 1981 she was member of the Russian Institute of Theatre Arts from she graduated in 1980 and became a teacher there a year after. From 1995 to 2001 she was a teacher at the Dance Academy of the New Humanitarian University of Natalia Nesterova and then held the same position at the Bolshoi Theater.

References

1938 births
Living people
20th-century Russian ballet dancers
People's Artists of the RSFSR
People's Artists of the USSR
Recipients of the Order of Friendship (South Ossetia)
Recipients of the Order of the Red Banner of Labour
Russian people of Ossetian descent
Soviet ballerinas